The 1897 Washington Senators baseball team finished the season with a 61–71 record, tied for sixth place in the National League.  The Senators (also known as the Nationals) finished in the first division in the only time in the franchise's nine-year run in the National League.  After getting off to a dismal 31–55 start, Washington won 30 of its last 46 games.  Their overall winning percentage (.462) would be the high-water mark for this franchise before it folded in contraction at the conclusion of the 1899 season.

Regular season

Season standings

Record vs. opponents

Opening Day lineup

Roster

Player stats

Batting

Starters by position 
Note: Pos = Position; G = Games played; AB = At bats; H = Hits; Avg. = Batting average; HR = Home runs; RBI = Runs batted in

Other batters 
Note: G = Games played; AB = At bats; H = Hits; Avg. = Batting average; HR = Home runs; RBI = Runs batted in

Pitching

Starting pitchers 
Note: G = Games pitched; IP = Innings pitched; W = Wins; L = Losses; ERA = Earned run average; SO = Strikeouts

Other pitchers 
Note: G = Games pitched; IP = Innings pitched; W = Wins; L = Losses; ERA = Earned run average; SO = Strikeouts

Relief pitchers 
Note: G = Games pitched; W = Wins; L = Losses; SV = Saves; ERA = Earned run average; SO = Strikeouts

References 
 1897 Washington Senators team page at Baseball Reference

Washington Senators (1891–1899) seasons
Washington Senators season
Washington Senators